Cyrtosia is a genus of flowering plants from the orchid family, Orchidaceae. It contains 5 known species, native to China, Japan, Korea, the Indian Subcontinent, Southeast Asia and New Guinea.

Cyrtosia integra (Rolfe ex Downie) Garay - Laos, Thailand, Vietnam
Cyrtosia javanica Blume - most of genus range
Cyrtosia nana (Rolfe ex Downie) Garay - Manipur, Thailand, Vietnam, Guizhou, Guangxi
Cyrtosia plurialata Seidenf. - Thailand
Cyrtosia septentrionalis (Rchb.f.) Garay - Japan, Korea, Ryukyu Islands, Anhui, Henan, Hunan, Zhejiang

See also 
 List of Orchidaceae genera

References 

  (1825) Bijdragen tot de flora van Nederlandsch Indië 8: 396.
  (2003) Genera Orchidacearum 3: 302 ff. Oxford University Press.
  2005. Handbuch der Orchideen-Namen. Dictionary of Orchid Names. Dizionario dei nomi delle orchidee. Ulmer, Stuttgart

External links 
 
 

Vanilloideae genera
Vanilleae
Myco-heterotrophic orchids